Janos Bedl (10 September 1929 – 9 December 1987) was a Hungarian football player and manager.

Managerial career
In 1967, Bedl managed the Pittsburgh Phantoms of the National Professional Soccer League.  In 1968, the NSPL merged with the United Soccer Association to form the North American Soccer League.  Bedl then coached the Kansas City Spurs in 1968 and 1969.  He was the 1968 NASL Coach of the Year and led Kansas City to the 1969 premiership. He also coached the Malta national football team from 13 February 1966 to 27 March 1966, as well as the Maltese team Sliema Wanderers and Belgian club Lierse S.K.

References

1929 births
1987 deaths
Hungarian footballers
Association football midfielders
Eredivisie players
Be Quick 1887 players
AFC DWS players
MVV Maastricht players
Sliema Wanderers F.C. players
Hungarian football managers
Sliema Wanderers F.C. managers
Malta national football team managers
North American Soccer League (1968–1984) coaches
National Professional Soccer League (1967) coaches
Borussia Dortmund managers
Lierse S.K. managers
Rot-Weiss Essen managers
Hungarian expatriate footballers
Hungarian expatriate football managers
Hungarian expatriate sportspeople in the Netherlands
Expatriate footballers in the Netherlands
Hungarian expatriate sportspeople in Malta
Expatriate football managers in Malta
Expatriate footballers in Malta
Hungarian expatriate sportspeople in the United States
Expatriate soccer managers in the United States
Hungarian expatriate sportspeople in West Germany
Expatriate football managers in West Germany
Hungarian expatriate sportspeople in Belgium
Expatriate football managers in Belgium